Roman Sloboda (born 14 January 1987) is a Slovak football midfielder.

References

External links
 
 

1987 births
Living people
Slovak footballers
Association football midfielders
FC Nitra players
FC ViOn Zlaté Moravce players
FK Mladá Boleslav players
FK Bohemians Prague (Střížkov) players
Slovak Super Liga players
Zagłębie Lubin players
Ekstraklasa players
Slovak expatriate footballers
Expatriate footballers in Poland
Expatriate footballers in the Czech Republic
People from Myjava
Sportspeople from the Trenčín Region